Emmelina argoteles (also known as the reed-bed plume) is a moth of the family Pterophoridae found in Asia and Europe. It was first described by Edward Meyrick in 1922.

Description
The wingspan is about 17 mm.

The larvae feed on hedge bindweed (Calystegia sepium), Calystegia sodanella, Japanese bindweed (Calystegia japonica), bindweed (Convolvulus species) and sweet potato (Ipomoea batatas).

Distribution
It is found in southern and central Europe, through Russia to India, China, Korea and Japan. It was discovered at Wicken Fen, Great Britain in 2005.

References

External links
 Taxonomic And Biological Studies Of Pterophoridae Of Japan (Lepidoptera)
 Japanese Moths
 Hantsmoths

Oidaematophorini
Moths described in 1922
Plume moths of Asia
Plume moths of Europe
Taxa named by Edward Meyrick